Zeeland is a province of the Netherlands.

Zeeland may also refer to:
 Zeeland (album), a 1997 album by German band La! Neu?
 Zeeland, Gelderland, a hamlet in Berg en Dal in the Netherlands
 Zeeland, Michigan, a city in the United States
 Zeeland, North Brabant, a village in the Netherlands
 Zeeland, North Dakota, a city in the United States
 County of Zeeland, an historical county in the Netherlands
 HNLMS Zeeland, several Dutch navy ships
 SS Zeeland, a list of ocean liners

See also
 New Zealand (disambiguation)
 Sealand (disambiguation)
 Seeland (disambiguation)
 Zealand (disambiguation)
 Zeelandia (disambiguation)